Plaisiodon is an extinct genus of Zygomaturinae from the late Miocene  Alcoota Fossil Beds in the Northern Territory, Australia. Because of its robust skull it has been suggested that it consumed relatively hard or coarse vegetation.

References

Prehistoric vombatiforms
Miocene marsupials
Miocene mammals of Australia
Prehistoric marsupial genera